In the history of rail transport, dating back to the 19th century, there have been hundreds of named passenger trains. Lists of these have been organized into geographical regions. Trains with numeric names are spelled out. For example, the 20th Century Limited is listed under "Twentieth Century Limited".

Named trains are sometimes identified through a train headboard, drumhead, lettering on the locomotive or passenger cars, or a combination of these methods.

Africa
List of named passenger trains of Africa

Asia

 List of named passenger trains of Bangladesh
List of named passenger trains of India
 List of named passenger trains of Indonesia
 List of named passenger trains of Japan
 List of named passenger trains of Pakistan
 List of named passenger trains of Russia
 List of named passenger trains of Sri Lanka
 List of named passenger trains of Southeast Asia

Oceania

List of named passenger trains of Australia
List of named passenger trains of New Zealand

Europe

List of named passenger trains of Europe
List of named passenger trains of Italy
List of named passenger trains of Russia
List of named passenger trains of Switzerland
List of named passenger trains of the United Kingdom

North America

List of named passenger trains of Canada
List of named passenger trains of Mexico
List of named passenger trains of the United States (A–B)
List of named passenger trains of the United States (C)
List of named passenger trains of the United States (D–H)
List of named passenger trains of the United States (I–M)
List of named passenger trains of the United States (N–R)
List of named passenger trains of the United States (S–Z)

References